Moiseenko or Moiseyenko is a surname. Notable people with the surname include:

Alexander Moiseenko (born 1980), Ukrainian chess grandmaster
Evsey Moiseenko (1916–1988), Soviet Russian painter
Vadim Moiseenko (born 1994), Russian chess grandmaster